Dhrousha is a village in the Paphos District of Cyprus, located 10 km south of Polis Chrysochous. It's located at 640 m above sea level.

Drousia or Drouseia or Droushia, one of the smallest villages in the mountainous area of Paphos, built at the highest point of the plateau of Laona, is located on the western side of the island. The settlement seems to have taken its name from the word “drosia” (meaning coolness, temperature-wise in Greek), since because of its altitude and its relatively short distance from Akamas, it remains a cool destination even during the summer months.

Notable people
Joseph of Vatopedi (1921–2009), monk at Mount Athos

References

Communities in Paphos District